Timmy Truett (born December 1, 1977) is an American politician and educator serving as a member of the Kentucky House of Representatives from the 89th district. He assumed office on November 23, 2021.

Career 
Outside of politics, Truett has worked as a pastor, coach, and educator. He also owns a pumpkin patch. He was the principal of McKee Elementary School in McKee, Kentucky. He was elected to the Kentucky House of Representatives in a November 2021 special election.

References 

1977 births
Republican Party members of the Kentucky House of Representatives
People from Jackson County, Kentucky
21st-century American politicians
Living people